The 1916–17 University of Virginia men's basketball team represented the University of Virginia during the 1916–17 NCAA men's basketball season. The team was led by twelfth-year head coach Henry Lannigan, and played their home games at Fayerweather Gymnasium in Charlottesville, Virginia. Now known as the Virginia Cavaliers, the team did not have an official nickname prior to 1923.

Schedule 

|-
!colspan=9 style="background:#00214e; color:#f56d22;"| Regular season

References

Virginia Cavaliers men's basketball seasons
Virginia
University
University